Sweethearts may refer to:

Films and television
Sweethearts (1938 film), a 1938 MGM film starring Jeanette MacDonald and Nelson Eddy
Sweethearts (1990 film), a 1990 Australian film
Sweethearts (1996 film), a 1996 film by Birger Larsen nominated for the Academy Award for Live Action Short Film
Sweethearts (1997 film), a 1997 independent film starring Janeane Garofalo
Sweethearts (game show), may refer to:
Sweethearts (TV series), a British version hosted by Larry Grayson
Sweethearts (U.S. game show), an American version hosted by Charles Nelson Reilly

Music
Sweethearts (music group), an Australian new soul group
Sweethearts (musical), a 1913 operetta by Victor Herbert
The Sweethearts, or Sweethearts of Sigma, an American trio of backing singers

Other
Sweethearts (book), a book by Sharon Rich, the full title being Sweethearts: The Timeless Love Affair Onscreen and Off Between Jeanette MacDonald and Nelson Eddy
Sweethearts (candy), a heart shaped candy
Sweethearts (comics), a romance comic published first by Fawcett Publications from 1948 to 1953 and continued by Charlton Comics from 1954 to 1973
Sweethearts (play), a two-act 1874 comedy by W.S. Gilbert based on a song of the same name by Gilbert and Arthur Sullivan
"The Sweethearts; or, The Top and the Ball", an 1843 fairytale by Hans Christian Andersen

See also
 Sweethearts on Parade (disambiguation)
 Sweetheart (disambiguation)